In neuroanatomy, the subparietal sulcus  or suprasplenial sulcus is a sulcus, or crevice, on the medial surface of each cerebral hemisphere, above the splenium of the corpus callosum. It separates the precuneus from the posterior part of the cingulate gyrus. It is the posterior continuation of the cingulate sulcus. The cingulate sulcus actually "terminates" as the marginal sulcus of the cingulate sulcus (margin of cingulate gyrus). It extends posteriorly toward the calcarine sulcus.

The precuneus is bordered anteriorly by the marginal branch of the cingulate sulcus (margin of cingulate sulcus), posteriorly by the parieto-occipital sulcus, and inferiorly by the subparietal sulcus.

Additional images

References 
 Michio Ono, Stefan Kubik, Chad D. Abernathey. Atlas of the Cerebral Sulci. 1990 
 Henry Gray.  Anatomy of the Human Body.  1918.

External links 

 http://braininfo.rprc.washington.edu/centraldirectory.aspx?ID=102

Sulci (neuroanatomy)
Medial surface of cerebral hemisphere